OPV may refer to:

 Offshore patrol vessel
 Optionally piloted vehicle, a hybrid between a conventional aircraft and an unmanned aerial vehicle (UAV)
 Oral polio vaccine, usually the Sabin preparation
 Original promotional videos (or sometimes other people's videos), unofficial music videos usually produced by anonymous fans, using the official audio version of a song but substituting alternative video footage
 Organic photovoltaic
 Om Prakash Valmiki, Dalit writer and poet. His autobiography, Joothan, is a well known work in Dalit literature
 OPV Nemesis, an Offshore Patrol Vessel of the New South Wales Police Force
 Old Poland Voivodeship
 Old Providence vireo (Vireo crassirostris), a bird of the West Indies
 Om Prakash Verma
 Omer Pashë Vrioni
 Omicron Persei VIII
 Operation Polar Valor
 Operation Police Victory
 Optional preferential voting, a system of vote-casting used in New South Wales and the Northern Territory in the Commonwealth of Australia
 OPV AIDS hypothesis, an alternative theory regarding the origin of the AIDS virus